Admiral Sir Raymond Derek Lygo,  (15 March 1924 – 7 March 2012) was a Royal Navy officer who served as Vice Chief of the Naval Staff from 1975 to 1978.

Naval career
Educated at Ilford County High School and Clark's College, Bromley, Lygo joined the Royal Navy at HMS St. Vincent (Fleet Air Arm basic training establishment in Gosport, Hampshire) in 1942 during the Second World War. He was appointed the commanding officer of the frigate  in 1961, the frigate  in 1967 and the aircraft carrier  in 1969. While in command of the latter in 1971, the Ark Royal collided with a Soviet cruiser that was shadowing her during an exercise in the Mediterranean. Damage to both vessels was slight, though two Soviet crewmen went missing. Lygo was cleared of any responsibility in the subsequent inquiry. He was next appointed Director-General, Naval Manpower and Training from February 1974 to June 1975. He went on to be Vice Chief of the Naval Staff in 1975 and retired in 1978.

Later life
After retirement, Lygo joined British Aerospace, becoming Chief Executive in 1986.

Lygo went on to be Chairman of the Rutland Trust in 1991, Chairman of TNT (Express) UK Ltd in 1992 and Chairman of the Liontrust First UK Investment Trust in 1997. He was Patron of the Fleet Air Arm Association.

Family
In 1950 Lygo married Pepper Van Osten; they had two sons and one daughter.

References

External links
 Imperial War Museum Interview

1924 births
2012 deaths
People educated at Ilford County High School
Royal Navy admirals
Knights Commander of the Order of the Bath
British businesspeople in the armaments industry
British chief executives
Place of birth missing
Place of death missing
Fleet Air Arm personnel of World War II